Supine hypertension is a paradoxical elevation in blood pressure upon assuming a supine position from a standing or sitting position. It is assumed to be a manifestation of disorders of the autonomic nervous system or due to side effects of medications such as midodrine and droxidopa.

References 

Blood pressure
Hypertension